Parkerview is an unincorporated area in the rural municipality of Garry No. 245, in the Canadian province of Saskatchewan. Parkerview is located on Highway 617 at the junction of Township road 275 in eastern Saskatchewan.

See also

List of communities in Saskatchewan
List of rural municipalities in Saskatchewan

Ghost towns in Saskatchewan
Garry No. 245, Saskatchewan
Unincorporated communities in Saskatchewan
Division No. 9, Saskatchewan